Oron may refer to:
"Light" or someone that is "being able" or "capable"  of doing anything posible or impossible.
Oron people a multi ethnic group of people living In the lower Cross River basin.
Oron Nation, one of the major states in the old Calabar Kingdom, Nigeria
Oron District, Switzerland
Oron, Vaud, Switzerland.  Created in 2012 it includes the former municipalities of:
Oron-la-Ville, Switzerland
Oron-le-Châtel, Switzerland
Oron, Moselle, France
Oron, Akwa Ibom, a city and local government area in Akwa Ibom State
Oron language, of Nigeria known as Oro
Oron people, a people from Akwa Ibom State in Nigeria
Oron, Israel, an industrial zone in Israel
Lake Oron, Bodaybo District, Russia
The largest of the Kapylyushi lakes, Baunt District, Russia
The Hebrew name for Uranus

People with the surname
Haim Oron, Israeli politician

People with the first name
Oron Shagrir, Israeli philosopher

Language and nationality disambiguation pages